Ali H. Chamseddine (born 20 February 1953) is a Lebanese physicist known for his contributions to particle physics, general relativity and mathematical physics.  , Chamseddine is a physics Professor at the American University of Beirut and the Institut des hautes études scientifiques.

Education and working positions
Ali H. Chamseddine was born in 1953 in the town of Joun, Lebanon. He received his BSc in Physics from the Lebanese University in July 1973. After receiving a scholarship from the Lebanese University to continue his graduate studies in Physics at Imperial College London, Chamseddine received a Diploma in Physics in June 1974, under the supervision of Tom Kibble. After that, Chamseddine did his PhD in Theoretical Physics at Imperial College London as well, in September 1976, where he studied under supervision of Nobel Prize winner Abdus Salam. Later on, Chamseddine did his post-doctoral studies at the Abdus Salam International Centre for Theoretical Physics (ICTP), and then continued his scientific career at universities including American University of Beirut, CERN, Northeastern University, ETH Zurich, and University of Zurich.

Scientific achievements

Chamseddine worked for his PhD dissertation on the newly developed field at the time: Supersymmetry. His Thesis, "Supersymmetry and higher spin fields", which was defended on September 1976, laid the foundation for his work with Peter West “Supergravity as a gauge theory of supersymmetry" using the fiber bundle formulation. This work is considered to be the most elegant formulation of N=1 Supergravity.

In 1980, while at CERN as a Scientific Associate, Chamseddine discovered ten-dimensional supergravity and its compactifications and symmetries in four dimensions. A year later, Chamseddine moved to Northeastern University, Boston, where he coupled ten-dimensional supergravity to Yang–Mills matter, and at the same time discovered the dual formulation of N=1 Supergravity in ten dimensions. This model turned out to be the low energy limit of the heterotic superstring. Chamseddine's most important achievement in the field is the one he did in 1982 in collaboration with Richard Arnowitt and Pran Nath at Northeastern University. They constructed the most general coupling of the supersymmetric standard model to supergravity, making the supersymmetry a local symmetry, and employing the super Higgs mechanism and developing the rules of tensor calculus. They then constructed the minimally supergravity standard model mSUGRA, which produces a supersymmetric standard model with spontaneous breaking with only four parameters and one sign instead of the more than 130 parameters that were used before. This work showed that the breaking of supersymmetry is a pure gravitational effect, which occurs at the Planckian scale and thus induces the breaking of electroweak symmetry. Their paper "Locally supersymmetric grand unification" is a highly cited paper and it is the model used by experimentalists at the LHC in the search for supersymmetry.

In 1992, Chamseddine started to work on a quantum theory of gravity, using the newly developed field of non-commutative geometry, which was founded by Alain Connes, as a suitable possibility. Together with Jürg Fröhlich and G. Felder, Chamseddine developed the structures needed to define Riemannian noncommutative geometry (metric, connection and curvature) by applying this method to a two-sheeted space. Later on, in 1996, Chamseddine started collaborating with Alain Connes that continues to the present day. They discovered the "Spectral action principle", which is a statement that the spectrum of the Dirac operator defining the noncommutative space is geometric invariant. Using this principle, Chamseddine and Connes determined that our space-time has a hidden discrete structure tensored to the visible four-dimensional continuous manifold. This principle, with the help of non-commutative geometry, determines all the fundamental fields and their dynamics. The surprise is that the resulting model was nothing but the Standard Model of particle physics with all its symmetries and fields, including the Higgs field as the gauge field along discrete directions as well as the phenomena of spontaneous symmetry breaking. The fermions come out with the correct representation, and their number is predicted to be 16 per family

The advantage of noncommutative geometry is that it provides a new paradigm of geometric space expressed in the language of quantum mechanics where operators replace coordinates. The new approach is in line with Albert Einstein's view where general relativity resulted from the geometry of curved manifolds. In 2010, Chamseddine and Connes noticed that the model has one new scalar field, not present in the Standard Model, which is responsible for the small neutrino masses. After the discovery of the Higgs particle, which is known not to be consistent with extending the Higgs coupling to very high energies, it was found that this new scalar field is exactly what is needed and cures the stability problem of the Standard Model.

In recent work, Chamseddine, Alain Connes and Viatcheslav Mukhanov, discovered a generalization of the Heisenberg uncertainty relation for geometry where the Dirac operator takes the role of momenta and the coordinates, tensored with Clifford algebra, serve as maps from the manifold to a sphere with the same dimension. They have shown that any connected Riemannian Spin 4-manifold with quantized volume appears as an irreducible representation of the two-sided commutation relations in dimensions four with the two kinds of spheres serving as quanta of geometry.

References

External links 
Scientific publications of Ali Chamseddine on INSPIRE-HEP

People associated with CERN
Living people
1953 births
TWAS laureates
Physicists
Lebanese physicists